The following are '''lists of sponges:

List of prehistoric sponge genera
List of sponges of Ireland
List of sponges of South Africa
List of sponges of Venezuela

See also
Sponge (disambiguation)
List of SpongeBob SquarePants characters